Oxypiloidea granulata is a species of praying mantis in the family Hymenopodidae.

See also
List of mantis genera and species

References

G
Mantodea of Africa